Zhmakino is a rural locality in Kosteltsevsky Selsoviet Rural Settlement, Kurchatovsky District, Kursk Oblast, Russia. Population:

Geography 

 Climate
Zhmakino has a warm-summer humid continental climate (Dfb in the Köppen climate classification).

Transport 

References

Notes

Sources

Rural localities in Kurchatovsky District, Kursk Oblast